This is a list of films produced by the Ollywood film industry based in Bhubaneshwar and Cuttack in 1997:

A–Z

References

1997
Ollywood#
 Ollywood
1990s in Orissa
1997 in Indian cinema